Hugo Veloso Oliveira Silva (born May 25, 1984 in Poços de Caldas), is a Brazilian midfielder. He currently plays for Uberlândia Esporte Clube.

Honours
Minas Gerais State League: 2004

Contract
Ipatinga (Loan) 21 August 2007 to 20 August 2008
Cruzeiro 2 January 2007 to 30 May 2009

External links
 CBF
 ipatingafc
 Time da Série B contrata meia-atacante do rival

1984 births
Living people
Brazilian footballers
Cruzeiro Esporte Clube players
Associação Desportiva Cabofriense players
América Futebol Clube (MG) players
Ipatinga Futebol Clube players
Association football midfielders
Sportspeople from Minas Gerais